The 1990–1991 Gulf War was the last major United States Air Force combat operation of the 20th Century. The command and control of allied forces deployed to the Middle East initially as part of Operation Desert Shield, later engaging in combat operations during Operation Desert Storm, were assigned to United States Central Command Air Forces (USCENTAF), the USAF component of the Joint United States Central Command.

United States Air Force units were initially deployed to Saudi Arabia in August 1990, being assigned directly to CENTAF with a mission to defend the kingdom. In November 1990, the decision was made to enhance the force into an offensive-capable one, and additional units were ordered deployed to CENTAF. As a result, CENTAF set up a table of organization which established provisional Air Divisions to prevent too many units reporting directly to CENTAF headquarters. These were as follows:

 The 14th Air Division (Provisional) commanded deployed primarily Tactical Air Command and United States Air Forces in Europe units with the mission of destroying enemy air, missile and ground forces, as well as enemy infrastructure targets. To accomplish this mission, the 14th-controlled A-10 Thunderbolt II ground attack aircraft; F-15C Eagle and F-16 Fighting Falcon fighters; F-111 light tactical bombers; EF-111 Raven electronic combat aircraft and the F-117 stealth attack aircraft. The division also provided electronic warfare, reconnaissance, and in-theater attached Strategic Air Command refueling support.
 The 15th Air Division (Provisional) commanded deployed Tactical Air Command units with a reconnaissance and electronic warfare mission focused on defeating enemy ground base air defenses and increasing the effectiveness of friendly formations. Aircraft deployed included RF-4C Phantom II tactical reconnaissance; F-4G Phantom II anti-radar; EC-130H Compass Call electronic warfare and two prototype E-8A Joint Stars battle management and command and control aircraft.
 The 1610th Air Division (Provisional) controlled Military Airlift Command C-130E/H Hercules theater airlift, aeromedical evacuation and Air Force Special Operations Command forces. Strategic Air Command deployed strategic electronic warfare and reconnaissance units also attached.
 The 17th Air Division (Provisional) commanded primarily provisional air refueling wings created from active-duty KC-135/KC-10 units of the Strategic Air Command's Fifteenth Air Force and SAC Air National Guard KC-135 units deployed within the CENTAF AOR.
 The SAC 7th Air Division commanded deployed Air Refueling and B-52 Stratofortress Bombardment Wings located outside of the CENTAF AOR.
 The 7440th Composite Wing was a United States Air Forces in Europe (USAFE) Provisional Wing under Joint Task Force Proven Force that flew combat missions over Northern and Central Iraq from Incirlik Air Base, Turkey.

Aftermath
After the end of combat operations, most of the combat forces of CENTAF returned to their home stations. The provisional organizations established were inactivated; their temporary nature meaning that no official lineage or history was retained by the USAF. On 13 March 1991 Headquarters Tactical Air Command activated the 4404th Tactical Fighter Wing (Provisional) at Prince Sultan Air Base, Al Kharj, to replace the provisional Air Divisions. The original assets of the 4404th TFW came from the 4th TFW (Provisional), which had operated during the Gulf War.

The long-term effect of the deployment and organization of Air Force Wings and Groups to CENTAF for the Gulf War eventually led to an Air Force-Wide reorganization of its Cold War command structure; the result being the modern Air Force organization structure which exists today. Air Force Expeditionary units, which are activated and inactivated as needed to support deployments were developed, replacing the "Provisional" units of the Gulf War.

14th Air Division (Provisional)
Brigadier General Buster Glosson served as commander, 14th Air Division (Provisional), and director of campaign plans for U.S. Central Command Air Forces, Riyadh, Saudi Arabia. 
 1st Tactical Fighter Wing (Provisional)
 Deployed from Langley Air Force Base, Virginia
 Headquarters: King Abdul Aziz Air Base, Dhahran, Saudi Arabia 

 4th Tactical Fighter Wing (Provisional)
 Deployed from Seymour Johnson Air Force Base, North Carolina
 Headquarters: Prince Sultan Air Base, Al Kharj, Saudi Arabia 

 33d Tactical Fighter Wing (Provisional)
 Deployed from Eglin Air Force Base, Florida
 Headquarters: King Faisal Air Base, Tabuk, Saudi Arabia 

 37th Tactical Fighter Wing (Provisional)
 Deployed from Tonopah Test Range Airport, Nevada
 Headquarters: King Khalid Air Base, Khamis Mushait, Saudi Arabia 

 48th Tactical Fighter Wing (Provisional)
 Deployed from RAF Lakenheath, England
 Headquarters: Taif Air Base, Taif, Saudi Arabia 

 354th Tactical Fighter Wing (Provisional)
 Deployed from Myrtle Beach Air Force Base, South Carolina
 Headquarters: King Fahd International Airport, Dammam, Saudi Arabia 

 363d Tactical Fighter Wing (Provisional)
 Deployed from Shaw Air Force Base, South Carolina
 Headquarters: Al Dhafra Air Base, Abu Dhabi, United Arab Emirates 

 388th Tactical Fighter Wing (Provisional)
 Deployed from Hill Air Force Base, Utah
 Headquarters: Al Minhad Air Base, Dubai, United Arab Emirates 

 401st Tactical Fighter Wing (Provisional)
 Deployed from Torrejón Air Base, Spain
 Headquarters: Doha International Airport, Qatar 

 4410th Operational Support Wing (Provisional)
 Deployed from Eglin AFB, Eglin Aux Fld#3, Florida
 Headquarters: King Khalid Military City, Saudi Arabia

Air Division, Provisional, 15
 35th Tactical Fighter Wing (Provisional)
 Deployed from George Air Force Base, California
 Headquarters: Doha International Airport, Qatar

 552d Airborne Warning and Control Wing (Provisional)
 Deployed from Tinker Air Force Base, Oklahoma
 Headquarters: King Khalid Air Base, Khamis Mushait, Saudi Arabia

 41st Electronic Combat Squadron (Provisional)
 Deployed from Davis-Monthan Air Force Base, Arizona
 Headquarters: Bateen Air Base, Abu Dhabi, United Arab Emirates 
 EC-130H Compass Call (Tail Code: DM), 27 August 1990–17 April 1991

 4411th Joint Stars Squadron
 Headquarters: King Khalid Air Base, Khamis Mushait, Saudi Arabia
 E-8A Joint Stars, December 1990-March 1991 (2 Aircraft)

1610th Air Division (Provisional)
 314th Tactical Airlift Wing (Provisional)
 Deployed from Little Rock Air Force Base, Arkansas
 Headquarters: Al Bateen Air Base, Abu Dhabi, United Arab Emirates

 317th Tactical Airlift Wing (Provisional)
 Deployed from Pope Air Force Base, North Carolina
 Headquarters: RAFO Thumrait, Oman 

 435th Tactical Airlift Wing (Provisional)
 Deployed from Rhein-Main Air Base, Germany
 Headquarters: Al Ain International Airport, Al Ain, United Arab Emirates 

 1640th Tactical Airlift Wing (Provisional)
 Detached from Headquarters Military Airlift Command, Scott AFB, Illinois
 Headquarters: Masirah Air Base, Oman 

 1650th Tactical Airlift Wing (Provisional)
 Detached from Headquarters Military Airlift Command, Scott AFB, Illinois
 Headquarters: Sharjah International Airport, Sharjah, United Arab Emirates 

 1670th Tactical Airlift Group (Provisional)
 Detached from Headquarters Military Airlift Command, Scott AFB, Illinois
 Headquarters: Prince Sultan Air Base, Al Kharj, Saudi Arabia

 Air Force Special Operations Command (Provisional)
 Detached from Headquarters AFSOC, Hurlburt Field, Florida
 Headquarters: King Fahd International Airport, Dammam, Saudi Arabia

 1612th Military Airlift Squadron (Provisional)
 Detached from Headquarters Military Airlift Command, Scott AFB, Illinois
 Headquarters: King Khalid Air Base, Khamis Mushait, Saudi Arabia
 C-21 Learjet, (8 Aircraft)
 C-12 Huron (7 Aircraft)
 RU-21 Learjet (7 Aircraft)
Provided Special Air Mission transport for CENTAF/CENTCOM leadership and civilian VIPs from coalition nations and the United States.

17th Air Division (Provisional)
 1700th Strategic Wing (Provisional)
 Detached from Headquarters 7th Air Division, Strategic Air Command, Ramstein AB, Germany
 Headquarters: King Khalid Air Base, Khamis Mushait, Saudi Arabia

 1701st Air Refueling Wing (Provisional)
 Headquarters: King Abdul Aziz Air Base, Jeddah, Saudi Arabia

 1701st Strategic Wing (Provisional)
 Headquarters: King Abdul Aziz Air Base, Jeddah, Saudi Arabia 

 1702d Air Refueling Wing (Provisional)
 Headquarters: Seeb International Airport, Muscat, Oman. 

 1706th Air Refueling Wing (Provisional)
 Headquarters: Cairo West Airport, Egypt 

 1708th Bombardment Wing (Provisional)
 Headquarters: King Abdul Aziz Air Base, Jeddah, Saudi Arabia
 20 B-52G Stratofortresses. The lead unit within the 1708th BW (P) was the 524th BS/379th BW from Wurtsmith AFB, Michigan. Aircraft and crews were also drawn from the 62d and 596th BS/2d BW Barksdale AFB, Louisiana; 69th BS/42d BW at Loring AFB, Maine; 328th BS/93d BW, Castle AFB, California, and the 668th BS/416 BW at Griffiss AFB, New York. B-52 operations at Jeddah were not possible prior to the initiation of combat so the wing gained its aircraft when the conflict began. Six aircraft from the 42d BW were moved to Jeddah from Diego Garcia on 17 January, and 10 more flew in from Wurthsmith, attacking targets en route. Although launched from Wurtsmith and flown by 379th BW crews, three of the aircraft came from the 93d BW at Castle and two from the 42d BW at Loring.

 1709th Air Refueling Wing (Provisional)
 Headquarters: King Abdul Aziz Air Base, Jeddah, Saudi Arabia

 1712th Air Refueling Wing (Provisional)
 Headquarters: Al Banteen Air Base, Abu Dhabi, United Arab Emirates

 1713th Air Refueling Wing (Provisional)
 Headquarters: Al Banteen Air Base, Abu Dhabi, United Arab Emirates

7th Air Division
 801st Air Refueling Wing (Provisional)
 Headquarters: Morón Air Base, Spain 

 801st Bombardment Wing (Provisional)
 Headquarters: Morón Air Base, Spain
 The 801st BW (P) consisted of 28 B-52G Stratofortresses and was formed around a nucleus provided by he 2d Bombardment Wing at Barksdale AFB, Louisiana and drew aircraft from the crews of the 524th BS/379th BW, Wurtsmith AFB, Michigan; the 668th BS/416th BW at Griffiss AFB, New York and from 69th BS/42d BW at Loring AFB, Maine. One B-52G (52-6503) was sent from the 340th BS/97th BW at Eaker AFB, Arkansas.

 802d Air Refueling Wing (Provisional)
 Headquarters: Lajes Field, Azores, Portugal 

 804th Air Refueling Wing (Provisional)
 Headquarters: Incirlik Air Base, Turkey 

 806th Bombardment Wing (Provisional)
 Headquarters: RAF Fairford, England 
 The 806th BW (P) was formed around a cadre of air and ground crews provided by the 97th Bombardment Wing, Eaker AFB, Arkansas. It consisted of a total of 11 B-52G Stratofortresses, also being drawn from the 668th BS/416th BW at Griffiss AFB, New York; 596th BS/2d BW, Barksdale AFB, Louisiana, and the 328th BS/93d BW at Castle AFB, California.

 807th Air Refueling Wing (Provisional)
 Headquarters: Incirlik Air Base, Turkey

 810th Air Refueling Wing (Provisional)
 Headquarters: Incirlik Air Base, Turkey

 4300th Bombardment Wing (Provisional)
 Headquarters: Diego Garcia, British Indian Ocean Territory [BIOT] 
 The lead unit for the 4300th BW (P) was the 69th BS/42d BW from Loring AFB, Maine. Aircraft were also drawn from the 328th BS/93d BW at Castle AFB, California. Six aircraft were transferred to Jeddah, Saudi Arabia on 17 January 1991 and they were replaced by six B-52Gs from the 1500th SW (P) at Andersen AFB, Guam.

See also
List of MAJCOM wings of the United States Air Force
List of USAF Provisional Wings assigned to Strategic Air Command

References

 Department of Defense Final Report to Congress, "Conduct of the Persian Gulf War," April 1992
 Smallwood, 2005, 'Warthog: Flying the A-10 in the Gulf War, Potomac Books Inc, 
 Mixer, Ronald E., Genealogy of the Strategic Air Command, Battermix Publishing Company, 1999 and Mixer, Ronald E., Strategic Air Command, An Organizational History, Battermix Publishing Company, 2006.
 Steijger, Cees 1991, A History of USAFE', Airlife Publishing Limited, 
   Baugher, Joe, 1999, McDonnell RF-4C Phantom II
  Baugher, Joe, 2003, McDonnell F-4G Phantom II
 Baugher, Joe, 2000, F-15 Eagle in Desert Storm
  Baugher, Joe, 2000, Service of General Dynamics F-16 Fighting Falcon with USAF
 Baugher, Joe, 2005, Developmental and Operational History of the F-117 Nighthawk
 F-117A: Desert Storm
 Baugher, Joe, 1999, General Dynamics F-111F
 Baugher, Joe, 1999, Grumman EF-111A Raven
 Globalsecurity.org Operation Desert Storm Air Forces Table of Organization
  Gulf War Air Power Survey Series Volume I, Part 2 Command and Control, pp 475-476

20th-century history of the United States Air Force
Orders of battle
United States Air Force units and formations by war